Aylin Daşdelen (born 1 January 1982 in Yiğitler village, Yenifakılı, Yozgat, Turkey) is a European champion Turkish female weightlifter competing in the Women's 53 kg and 58 kg divisions. At the championships held 2003 in Loutraki, Greece, she broke three European records, in snatch, clean&jerk and in total weight lifted of the -58 kg division.

Aylin is a member of the Kocaeli Büyükşehir Belediyesi Kağıt Spor Kulübü in İzmit.

Early life
She was born 1982 in Yiğitler village, Yenifakılı, Yozgat Province.

Scandal
Aylin Daşdelen and her two teammates, Sibel Şimşek and Şule Şahbaz, filed in September 2004 complaints of sexual harassment against Mehmet Üstündağ, who was the coach of the Turkey national women's weightlifting team. He was accused of repeated physical sexual molestation going back several years. The court ordered the arrest of him despite his denial. Daşdelen told a television news program that Üstündağ also made it a habit of "beating" his charges. She blamed the trainer also for the 1999 suicide of teammate Esma Can.

The only support for Üstündağ came from Nurcan Taylan, who in turn accused her three teammates of being "lesbians". Üstündağ came under investigation on similar charges in the 2000s, but the evidence was inconclusive.

Achievements 

Olympics

World Championships

European Championships

Mediterranean Games

Legend:
ER European record

References

External links
 Aylin Daşdelen at Weightlifting Database
 
 
 

1982 births
People from Yenifakılı
Living people
Weightlifters at the 2004 Summer Olympics
Olympic weightlifters of Turkey
Turkish female weightlifters
World Weightlifting Championships medalists
Kocaeli Büyükşehir Belediyesi Kağıt Spor athletes
Weightlifters at the 2012 Summer Olympics
European champions in weightlifting
European champions for Turkey
Mediterranean Games gold medalists for Turkey
Mediterranean Games bronze medalists for Turkey
Competitors at the 2009 Mediterranean Games
Competitors at the 2013 Mediterranean Games
Mediterranean Games medalists in weightlifting
European Weightlifting Championships medalists
20th-century Turkish sportswomen
21st-century Turkish sportswomen